Melchert is a surname. Notable people with the surname include:

Catherine J. Melchert, mayor of Bartlett, Illinois from 1993 to 2009
Christopher Melchert, American professor and scholar of Islam
Craig Melchert (born 1945), American linguist 
Norman Melchert (born 1933), American philosopher and author
Sven Melchert, German astronomer